The Five Directorates were five service agencies in the central government of the Sui, Tang, and Song dynasties of China, apart from the Nine Courts.

The Five Directorates included:
Directorate of Waterways
Directorate for Imperial Manufactories
Directorate for the Palace Buildings
Directorate for Armaments
Directorate of Education, during the Sui and Tang dynasties
Directorate of Astronomy, during the Five Dynasties period and Song dynasty

References

Government of Imperial China